The women's doubles tournament of the 2017 BWF World Championships (World Badminton Championships) took place from 21 to 27 August.

Seeds

  Misaki Matsutomo / Ayaka Takahashi (semifinals)
  Kamilla Rytter Juhl / Christinna Pedersen (semifinals)
  Chang Ye-na / Lee So-hee (quarterfinals)
  Chen Qingchen / Jia Yifan (champion)
   Jung Kyung-eun / Shin Seung-chan (quarterfinals)
  Huang Dongping / Li Yinhui (third round)
  Shiho Tanaka / Koharu Yonemoto (quarterfinals)
  Luo Ying / Luo Yu (third round)
  Yuki Fukushima / Sayaka Hirota (final)
  Naoko Fukuman / Kurumi Yonao (third round)
  Gabriela Stoeva / Stefani Stoeva (third round)
  Chae Yoo-jung / Kim So-yeong (third round)
  Kim Hye-rin / Yoo Hae-won (third round)
  Bao Yixin / Yu Xiaohan (quarterfinals)
  Maiken Fruergaard / Sara Thygesen (third round)
  Anastasia Chervyakova / Olga Morozova (third round)

Draw

Finals

Section 1

Section 2

Section 3

Section 4

References
Draw

2017 BWF World Championships
BWF